Marion Kische (later Wellner, born 30 March 1958 in Dresden) is a German former gymnast who competed in the 1976 Summer Olympics.

References

External links

1958 births
Sportspeople from Dresden
Living people
German female artistic gymnasts
Olympic gymnasts of East Germany
Gymnasts at the 1976 Summer Olympics
Olympic bronze medalists for East Germany
Olympic medalists in gymnastics
Medalists at the 1976 Summer Olympics
Trumpy Walter: Marion Kirshe https://youtu.be/G8iP6uQTc80